Quinton Rashod Rose (born January 26, 1998) is an American professional basketball player for the Westchester Knicks of the NBA G League. He played college basketball for the Temple Owls.

High school career
Rose grew up in Rochester, New York and began playing with fellow standout Thomas Bryant in third grade. Rose's younger brother Miles is also a basketball player. Quinton played basketball for Bishop Kearney High School in Irondequoit, New York. As a junior, he averaged 15.4 points, seven rebounds and seven assists per game. In his senior season, Rose averaged 23 points and six rebounds per game, leading Bishop Kearney to the Class AA sectional semifinals and earning second-team All-State honors. He played Amateur Athletic Union (AAU) basketball with the City Rocks, with whom he drew attention from many NCAA Division I programs. Rose was considered a four-star recruit by ESPN and a three-star recruit by 247Sports and Rivals. He committed to play for Temple at the collegiate level on August 7, 2015.

College career
Rose was named American Athletic Conference Rookie of the Week four times during his freshman season and earned a spot on the conference All-Rookie Team. He started six games and averaged 10.1 points and 4.1 rebounds per game. As a sophomore, Rose averaged 14.9 points, 4.3 rebounds, 2.3 assists, and 1.5 steals per game as Temple lost in the first round of the NIT to eventual champion Penn State. He declared for the 2018 NBA draft but opted to return to Temple after working out with several teams. He was told by NBA scouts that he needed to get stronger and improve his three-point shot. On March 3, 2019, Rose scored a career-high 29 points in an 80–69 win against Tulane. As a junior, Rose was named second-team All-American Athletic Conference. He averaged 16.3 points, 3.8 rebounds, and 2.4 assists per game. He was hampered by a stress fracture in his foot for the last two months of the season, and had offseason foot surgery. On February 8, 2020, Rose scored 25 points in an overtime win over SMU, becoming the all-time leading scorer for the American Athletic Conference. He passed Rob Gray of Houston’s mark of 1,710 career points, set in 2018. At the conclusion of the regular season. Rose was named to the Second Team All-AAC. He was named to the First Team All-Big 5.

Professional career

Westchester Knicks (2021–present) 
After going undrafted in the 2020 NBA draft, Rose signed an Exhibit 10 contract with the Sacramento Kings. Rose was waived on December 11. On March 4, 2021, he was signed by the Westchester Knicks. On October 25, 2021, Rose was included in training camp roster of the Westchester Knicks.

National team career
In 2016, Rose played for the United States at the Albert Schweitzer Tournament, an under-18 competition in Mannheim, Germany. He averaged a team-high 13.8 points per game as the United States finished in ninth place. Rose was a training camp finalist to play at the 2017 FIBA Under-19 World Cup in Cairo but was not named to the final roster.

Career statistics

College

|-
| style="text-align:left;"| 2016–17
| style="text-align:left;"| Temple
| 32 || 6 || 24.8 || .434 || .296 || .689 || 4.1 || 1.9 || 1.5 || .4 || 10.1
|-
| style="text-align:left;"| 2017–18
| style="text-align:left;"| Temple
| 33 || 32 || 32.2 || .434 || .345 || .653 || 4.3 || 2.3 || 1.5 || .2 || 14.9
|-
| style="text-align:left;"| 2018–19
| style="text-align:left;"| Temple
| 33 || 33 || 34.6 || .408 || .275 || .685 || 3.8 || 2.5 || 2.2 || .2 || 16.3
|-
| style="text-align:left;"| 2019–20
| style="text-align:left;"| Temple
| 31 || 31 || 33.4 || .368 || .270 || .792 || 5.0 || 3.5 || 2.0 || .7 || 16.4
|- class="sortbottom"
| style="text-align:center;" colspan="2"| Career
| 129 || 102 || 31.3 || .408 || .297 || .717 || 4.3 || 2.5 || 1.8 || .4 || 14.4

References

External links
Temple Owls bio
USA Basketball bio

1998 births
Living people
American men's basketball players
Basketball players from New York (state)
Shooting guards
Small forwards
Sportspeople from Rochester, New York
Temple Owls men's basketball players
Westchester Knicks players